is a  video game in the Final Fantasy series developed by BitGroove and published by Square Enix. The game was released for iOS and Android mobile devices.

The title features gameplay, characters, locations, and art assets from many different Final Fantasy games. Gameplay focuses on expanding the number of characters players possess and unlocking all the character jobs available by defeating enemies and bosses. Players can also include up to forty characters in their parties.

The game has been met with near-universal disapproval, citing a lack of gameplay depth, no character customization, no story, and costly in-app purchases. Positives mentioned were the humorous flavor text and nostalgia for the original games from which the title draws. One of the games’ producers later stated that the title is an app, not a game, and understood that this confusion had led to disappointment by players.

Gameplay

Combat
Players' characters traverse an overhead map between battles. After a series of battles, players confront a boss enemy. During combat, the player controls a party of characters that can be as large as forty individuals. The game features the Active Time Battle (ATB) system found in other Final Fantasy titles. In this system, battles are turn-based, with turns taken when the gradually increasing ATB gauge reaches its capacity. Upon attacking, the bar is emptied and gradually starts refilling again. Defeating enemies grants experience points which the player needs to level up. Strengthening characters in this way gives players character slots to expand the player's party. When characters discover weaponry, it is auto equipped to all characters that can wield it. Once every three hours, the Fever option is available, granting the player the ability to attack without needing the ATB gauge to be refilled.

Features

Battles feature 30 songs from the Final Fantasy franchise, most of which are battle themes from different titles. Progress in the game unlocks 20 different character jobs such as blue mage, knight, and thief. The player may encounter enemies, including boss characters from previous titles, as well as recurring enemies such as behemoths and cactuars. A player can use Facebook and Twitter within the game to promote the title and earn extra character slots. The game also features leaderboards for those who have advanced the farthest.

In-app purchases
When characters are defeated, they take 3 minutes to revive per character (not simultaneously). Golden hourglass items are purchasable in order to revive all defeated characters instantly. Players can purchase premium characters from previous Final Fantasy games in the in-game shop at random. Characters include Tifa Lockhart, Rinoa Heartilly, Terra Branford, Chocobo, Moogle, a pig from Final Fantasy IV, and others. World tickets are also purchasable to access notable Final Fantasy locations, including Zanarkand, Midgar, and Archylte Steppe.

Development
The first hints of the game's existence came when Square Enix trademarked the name All the Bravest on December 1, 2012. Speculation began that the title related to Bravely Default: Flying Fairy. Square Enix later posted a teaser page on their Japanese website with silhouettes of Final Fantasy heroes and enemies and a date of “1.17.”  This teaser led to further speculation that the game would be a re-release of Final Fantasy V or Final Fantasy VI. However, critics quickly dismissed both theories. Square Enix officially unveiled the title on January 16, 2013, as Final Fantasy: All the Bravest, despite initial plans for the unveiling to occur the next day. All the Bravest released in the Google Play Store on September 13, 2013.

All the Bravest co-producer Ichiro Hazama recognized that the title “was a fun app, not a game”. He also acknowledged that since it was not a full game, many fans were disappointed and that apps must be marketed appropriately based on what they are.

Reception

Final Fantasy: All the Bravest was almost universally panned. Reviewers mainly focused their criticisms on the large number and cost of in-app purchases along with the lack of story, simplistic gameplay, and a lack of respect for players by Square Enix. Despite the poor reception, the game still managed to chart at number 25 on the "Top Paid Apps" chart on the iTunes App Store on January 18, 2013.

IGN stated that despite a small amount of nostalgia, the game had such high prices for its in-game purchases that it was insulting with the gameplay was repetitive and boring. They ultimately concluded that the game was a black mark on the Final Fantasy franchise. They even took the unprecedented step of issuing a public service announcement not to buy the game. They later cited the game for making money despite bad reviews and high prices. Pocket Gamer also criticized the gameplay and in-app purchase system, stating that there was hardly any game to at all, with the app being like a shady casino. Slide to Play criticized the game for having no gameplay or strategy and that it existed to take people's money. Digital Spy echoed the criticisms of the games in-app purchases and poor gameplay, stating that it felt like a "parody" of what free-to-play games are like, feeling that it exists to "make loyal fans waste their money," adding that it would have had some appeal if not for its "shallow" gameplay.

1Up.com also attacked the lack of real gameplay, as they believed the active time battle system has players attack with no thought to skills, weapons, or even characters. Pocket Tactics, like IGN, also issued a public service announcement not to buy the game. They stated that they long defended Square Enix's higher mobile game pricing, but believed that this title was so poor that it showed their disdain for fans. Kotaku also stated that the game is emblematic of Square Enix's lack of respect for fans, and a desire to milk the franchise for money.

GamesRadar+ ranked it as the 44th worst game ever made. The staff accused its developers of cashing in on the Final Fantasy brand. USgamer cited the game as being the most notable misstep Square Enix had done since CEO Yosuke Matsuda took over. However, it also noted that the project had begun under the previous CEO, Yoichi Wada.

A few critics found elements to compliment. 4Gamer loved the music, monsters, and characters that appeared from past Final Fantasy titles, as well as being able to fight with such a large party. Famitsu also praised the appearance of so many familiar villains from each Final Fantasy title and called the boss fights challenging. Gamezebo noted that the game ran well even with a significant amount of action occurring on-screen. Kotaku identified the menus' flavor text as hilarious, and the only reason to get the game.

References

External links

Role-playing video games
Android (operating system) games
Final Fantasy video games
Gacha games
IOS games
Retro-style video games
Single-player video games
2013 video games
Video games developed in Japan